The Australian national cricket team visited Pakistan in October 1956 and played a single Test match against the Pakistani national cricket team. Pakistan won the Test series 1–0. Australia were captained by Ian Johnson and Pakistan by Abdul Hafeez Kardar. The Test match was the first between the two teams. The opening day's play was the slowest in the history of Test cricket, with just 95 runs scored.

Test series

Only Test

References

External links

1956 in Australian cricket
1956 in Pakistani cricket
Australian cricket tours of Pakistan
International cricket competitions from 1945–46 to 1960
Pakistani cricket seasons from 1947–48 to 1969–70